Ehlers Round Barn, in Roca, Nebraska, was completed in 1924 by Harvey W. Ehlers.  It was listed on the National Register of Historic Places for its innovative and efficient architecture in 1995.

A snowstorm on 4 February 2012 resulted in severe damage to the structure, and it is purportedly "beyond repair."  It was delisted on December 31, 2013.

References

Barns on the National Register of Historic Places in Nebraska
Buildings and structures in Lancaster County, Nebraska
Buildings and structures completed in 1924
Round barns in Nebraska
National Register of Historic Places in Lancaster County, Nebraska
Former National Register of Historic Places in Nebraska